is a passenger railway station located in the city of Nantan, Kyoto Prefecture, Japan, operated by West Japan Railway Company (JR West).

Lines

Station layout
The station consists of two opposed side platforms connected to the station building by a footbridge. The station is staffed.

Platforms

History
Yagi Station opened on 15 August 1899. With the privatization of the Japan National Railways (JNR) on 1 April 1987, the station came under the aegis of the West Japan Railway Company. 

Station numbering was introduced in March 2018 with Yagi being assigned station number JR-E14.

The current station building was completed in April 2021 along with barrier-free improvements.

Passenger statistics
In fiscal 2018, the station was used by an average of 1440 passengers daily.

Surrounding area
 Nantan City Office Yagi Branch (former: Yagi Town Office)
 Japan National Route 9
 Kyoto Chubu Medical Center

See also
List of railway stations in Japan

References

External links

 Station Official Site

Railway stations in Kyoto Prefecture
Sanin Main Line
Railway stations in Japan opened in 1899
Nantan, Kyoto